Denis Ristov (born 24 June 1990) is a Serbian football midfielder, playing for FK Sileks.

Club career

Early career
Born in Pirot, Ristov started playing football with local club Radnički at the age of 8. He joined the first team of Radnički Pirot when he was 17, and made his debut in the last fixture of the 2007–08 Serbian First League season. Later, after club relegated in the Serbian League East, Ristov was sold to Partizan at the beginning of 2009, where he spent 6 months until the end of his youth career and scored 14 goals on 15 matches for youth team. Later he moved to Teleoptik, but he spent mostly time as a loaned player with Balkanski and Radnički Pirot between 2009 and 2010 period.

Donji Srem
Ristov joined Donji Srem at the beginning of 2011. After winning 2010–11 Serbian League Vojvodina, he was also one of the most standard players in squad during the 2011–12 Serbian First League with 2 goals on 26 league matches and 1 cup match. After Donji Srem promoted in the Serbian SuperLiga, Ristov made just 4 league caps, including historical win against his ex-club Partizan in which he played last 5 minutes of the match, and 1 cup appearance during the 2012–13 season.

Radnički Pirot
In summer 2013, Ristov decided to return in his home club Radnički Pirot. During the first half-season, he was used mostly as a reserve although he started season in first 11. Later, for the second half-season, he was standard player, missing 1 match and was also replaced just once time in the last match of 2013–14 Serbian League East season, and he scored 4 goals for the season. He also played Pirot district cup match against Balkanski. During the 2014–15 Serbian League East season, Ristov noted 26 league caps with 11 goals, and also played Pirot district cup match against Balkanski as the last year, and was in protocol in the final match against Lužnica. Later he also played against Železničar Vranjska Banja in the semi-final regional cup match. Ristov was one of the most important players in the 2015–16 season, scoring 16 goals on 27 Serbian League East matches. He also played Pirot district matches against Jedinstvo Pirot, and Lužnica.

Career statistics

Club

Honours

Club
Donji Srem
Serbian League Vojvodina: 2010–11

Radnički Pirot
Serbian League East: 2015–16

References

External links
 Denis Ristov stats at utakmica.rs 
 
 
 

1990 births
Living people
People from Pirot
Serbian footballers
Serbian expatriate footballers
Association football midfielders
FK Teleoptik players
FK Balkanski players
FK Donji Srem players
FK Radnički Pirot players
FK Novi Pazar players
FK Sileks players
Serbian First League players
Serbian SuperLiga players
Macedonian First Football League players
Serbian expatriate sportspeople in North Macedonia
Expatriate footballers in North Macedonia